I'm No Longer Here is a 2019 Mexican Spanish-language drama film written and directed by Fernando Frías de la Parra, and starring Juan Daniel Garcia Treviño and Angelina Chen.

The script, completed in 2013, was originally published as a short story before being adapted as a full-length feature. It was released on 27 February 2020 to positive reviews from critics, before receiving a global Netflix release on 27 May 2020.

The film was also screened in several film festivals including the 2020 Tribeca Film Festival and received several awards and nominations in international festivals. It was selected as the Mexican entry for the Best International Feature Film at the 93rd Academy Awards, making the shortlist of fifteen films, but was not nominated.

Plot 
The film is presented in a nonlinear narrative, jumping between Ulises's experiences in Mexico and the United States. The following is a linear summary of the plot:

In 2011, in the slums of Monterrey, a 17-year-old teenager named Ulises is the leader of a gang called Los Terkos. They dedicate themselves to hanging out and following the counter-culture of Kolombia: a lifestyle that consists of dancing and listening to "Cumbia rebajada" (a slowed version of Cumbia). Los Terkos members dress in bright, baggy clothes and sport homemade, eccentric hairdos. The majority of their time is spent attending dance parties and showing off their stylish colors.

While attempting to retrieve some money from students outside a school so that Los Terkos can buy an MP3 player, Ulises and his gang are confronted by a member of an organized criminal group called Los F who tries to scare them away. Later, as a different member of Los F is arrested by police, one of the Terkos steals the criminal's hand radio. That night, Los Terkos play a prank on Los F using the radio, only to be easily located by two armed members of Los F who threaten Ulises and his friend Jeremy to quit their relaxed gang lifestyle or be killed.

The next day, Ulises accidentally witnesses the drive-by shooting of members of a fellow gang, Los Pelones, by Los F. One of the survivors, while badly wounded, notices Ulises holding the radio the Terkos stole from Los F earlier and incorrectly assumes that Ulises had set up the shooting. The survivor accuses Ulises of being a traitor and orders him to run away, threatening to kill his family if he does not. Ulises and his family flee the slum, and his mother uses some favors to smuggle Ulises into the United States illegally, demanding that he stay away from criminal activities. As Ulises leaves, one of the Terkos, Chaparra, gives Ulises the MP3 device that Los Terkos had planned to purchase from a bootleg music salesman.

After being smuggled inside a van across the border, Ulises arrives in Queens, and lives with a group of day laborers who he soon gets into conflict with due to his lack of experience with manual labor, not knowing English, and his musical preferences. This leads to a fight with one of his roommates when they turn off the music during a party. After the fight, he leaves and takes a job cleaning the rooftop of a store owned by Mr. Loh, a Chinese man. His grandniece, Lin, is curious about Ulises and befriends him, wanting to learn more about his past way of life. She buys him a dictionary to help him learn English and allows Ulises to live in a run-down shed on the roof.

Ulises tries to earn some easy money by dancing to his Kumbia in a subway station and in the streets, only to be scared away each time by police and homeless people. He attends a party with Lin but leaves alone after getting drunk on beer and feeling homesick. He calls home but his mother rejects the idea of coming back, as Los F would kill him on sight. He goes back to a Latin bar he had gone to with his former roommates to seek advice from a Colombian sex worker he briefly connected with while there. After spending the night in her living room, she tells him that she cannot see him again, either at the bar or at her apartment. Ulises wanders the streets and buys a bottle of paint thinner. He inhales it before cutting his hair while intoxicated.

Ulises is caught sleeping in the streets by the police and is deported back to Mexico after spending some months in prison. He travels back to his slum in Monterrey to find that Los F have taken control of the populace, with most of Los Terkos having joined the criminal organization. After attending the funeral of one of his old Terko friends, Ulises visits Jeremy. He finds that Jeremy has converted to Christianity and spends his days preaching, in rap form, to other boys in the slum. Despite an offer to stay with Jeremy, Ulises decides to live on the streets by himself. He dances one last time to the music on his MP3 device before the battery dies. In the distance, he sees a large group of neighborhood residents running towards the slums to hide from the police after deliberately blocking a major avenue as a distraction, allowing the members of Los F to run away and avoid arrest.

Cast 
Juan Daniel Garcia Treviño as Ulises Sampiero
Jonathan Espinoza as Jeremy
Angelina Chen as Lin
Coral Puente as Chaparra
Adríana Arbelaez as Gladys
Leonardo Garxa as Pekesillo
Yahir Alday as Sudadera

Awards and nominations

Notes

See also
 List of submissions to the 93rd Academy Awards for Best International Feature Film
 List of Mexican submissions for the Academy Award for Best International Feature Film

References

External links 
 
 

2010s musical drama films
2019 films
Mexican musical drama films
2010s Spanish-language films
Hood films
Spanish-language Netflix original films
2019 drama films
2010s Mexican films
Works about Mexican drug cartels